Privolzhsky is a rural locality (a settlement) in Svetloyarsky District, Volgograd Oblast, Russia. The population was 1,220 as of 2010. There are 21 streets.

Geography 
Privolzhsky is located 43 km southwest of Svetly Yar (the district's administrative centre) by road. Novosad is the nearest rural locality.

References 

Rural localities in Svetloyarsky District